José Nazábal Mimendia (born 1 July 1951) is a Spanish former professional road bicycle racer.

He was born at Zaldivia. In 1977, Nazabal won a stage in both the Vuelta a España and in the Tour de France.

Major results
1976
GP Navarra
1977
Vuelta a España: Winner stage 18
Vuelta a Aragón
Tour de France: Winner stage 3

See also
 List of doping cases in cycling

External links 

Official Tour de France results for José Nazabal

1951 births
Living people
Spanish male cyclists
Spanish Tour de France stage winners
People from Goierri
Sportspeople from Gipuzkoa
Cyclists from the Basque Country (autonomous community)